
Gmina Dobroń is a rural gmina (administrative district) in Pabianice County, Łódź Voivodeship, in central Poland.

Villages
Gmina Dobroń contains the villages and settlements of Barycz, Chechło Drugie, Chechło Pierwsze, Dobroń Duży, Dobroń Mały, Dobroń Poduchowny, Ldzań, Markówka, Mogilno Duże, Mogilno Małe, Morgi, Orpelów, Poleszyn, Róża, Wymysłów Francuski and Wymysłów-Piaski.

Neighbouring gminas
Gmina Dobroń is bordered by the town of Pabianice and by the gminas of Dłutów, Łask, Pabianice and Wodzierady.

References
Polish official population figures 2006

Dobron
Pabianice County